Sir German Sims Woodhead, KBE FRSE PRMS LLD (29 April 1855 – 29 December 1921) was an English pathologist.

Life 
He was born at Woodland Mount, a large country house near Huddersfield, on 29 April 1855 the son of Joseph Woodhead, a newspaper owner (and later politician), and his wife Catherine Woodhead.

He was educated at Huddersfield College. He then studied Medicine at Edinburgh University, graduating MB ChB in 1878.

From 1885 to 1890 he worked as a lab assistant in Edinburgh University, living then at 6 Marchhall Crescent. During his time in Edinburgh, in 1886, he was elected a Fellow of the Royal Society of Edinburgh. His proposers were Sir William Turner, Alexander Crum Brown, Robert Gray and Sir John Murray.

In 1890, aged only 35, he became Director of the Conjoint Laboratories of the Royal Colleges of Physicians and of Surgeons in London.

In 1899 he was made Professor of Pathology in Cambridge University. He was the first Editor of the Journal of Pathology.

In the First World War he was the Inspector of Government Laboratories serving all military hospitals. He was attached to the RAMC at the rank of Lt Colonel. Largely as a result of this service he was knighted (KBE) by King George V in 1919.

He died at Aisthorpe Hall in Lincolnshire on 29 December 1921 and is buried in Cambridge City Cemetery.

Family
In 1881, he married Harriet Elizabeth St Clair Erskine Yates.

Published Work 
Practical Pathology (1883)
Pathological Mycology (1885), with A. W. Hare
Bacteria and Their Products (1891)
Report to the Royal Commission on Tuberculosis (1895)

References

External links

 
 
Sir German Sims Woodhead
Michael Worboys, 'Woodhead, Sir German Sims (1855–1921)', Oxford Dictionary of National Biography, Oxford University Press, 2004

English pathologists
English medical writers
English tax resisters
1855 births
1921 deaths
People educated at Huddersfield New College
Medical doctors from Yorkshire
Knights Commander of the Order of the British Empire
Alumni of the University of Edinburgh Medical School
Fellows of the Royal Microscopical Society
Fellows of the Royal Society of Edinburgh